A special election was held in  April 24–26, 1804 to fill a vacancy left by the resignation of John Smith (DR) on February 22, 1804, after being elected to the Senate.  The election was held at the same time as the elections for the 9th Congress and were combined into a single election, with the candidate receiving the most votes going to the 9th Congress and the candidate with the second most votes going to the 8th Congress.

Election results 

Wickes won the seat for the 9th Congress and Riker for the remainder of the 8th Congress, taking his seat on November 5, 1804.

See also 
 List of special elections to the United States House of Representatives

References 

New York 1804 1
New York 1804 1
1804 1
New York 1
United States House of Representatives 1
United States House of Representatives 1804 01